Pláně is a municipality and village in Plzeň-North District in the Plzeň Region of the Czech Republic. It has about 300 inhabitants.

Administrative parts
Villages of Korýtka, Ondřejov and Vrážné are administrative parts of Pláně.

References

Villages in Plzeň-North District